Nedžat Šabani ( (born 11 November 1963) is a Macedonian football manager and former striker of Albanian descent.

Club career
After playing initially with FK Vardar in the Yugoslav First League, he went on during the mid-1980s to several Yugoslav Second League clubs in order to gain more experience, such were KF Liria Prizren, FK Belasica and FK Proleter Zrenjanin. He then also played with third-level side FK Metalurg Skopje which was at time rising to become in the flowing decade a regular participant in the Macedonian top-league.

He then moved to Turkey and played in the Süper Lig one season with  Sarıyer S.K. (1992/93), and another with Kayserispor (1993/94).

Managerial career
He started coaching FK Sloga Jugomagnat in March 2002 after the departure of the main coach Gjore Jovanovski whose Šabani was working with as assistant manager. Once Jovanovski left to Turkey to coach Sansunspor, the Renova direction board decided to give a chance to Šabani to demonstrate his skills as main coach. He would resign in late October that year.

Šabani later coached FK Renova from July 2008 till November 2010. What he became best known was by taking the relatively unknown village club to win the 2009–10 Macedonian First Football League.

In October 2011 Šabani was appointed as the main coach of KF Shkëndija.

Honours
As coach:
Renova
Macedonian First League: 2009–10

References

1963 births
Living people
Albanian footballers from North Macedonia
Association football forwards
Yugoslav footballers
Macedonian footballers
FK Vardar players
KF Liria players
FK Belasica players
FK Proleter Zrenjanin players
FK Metalurg Skopje players
Sarıyer S.K. footballers
Kayserispor footballers
Yugoslav First League players
Süper Lig players
Macedonian expatriate footballers
Expatriate footballers in Turkey
Macedonian expatriate sportspeople in Turkey
Macedonian football managers
FK Sloga Jugomagnat managers
KF Bashkimi (1947–2008) managers
KF Renova managers
FK Shkëndija managers